Newcombville  is a community in the Canadian province of Nova Scotia, located in the Lunenburg Municipal District in Lunenburg County 11 kilometers or seven miles from Bridgewater-the county service center on the shores of the LaHave River.

References
Newcombville on Destination Nova Scotia

Communities in Lunenburg County, Nova Scotia
General Service Areas in Nova Scotia